Ki Fitzgerald (born Ki McPhail), also known as Azteck, is an English DJ, musician, singer, songwriter and record producer. He has written/produced and vocalist on several top 10 singles and albums and was a founding member of the English pop rock band Busted from 2000 to 2001. KiFi is also the feature vocalist on Don Diablo's single "The Same Way", Hardwell/Wildstylez's single "Shine a Light" and Armin van Buuren's "Turn It Up".

Early life
Fitzgerald was born in Rotterdam, Netherlands to British parents, but moved at six years old and grew up in Kent, England. His father is the singer Scott Fitzgerald, who had an international hit with "If I Had Words" and also represented the United Kingdom at the 1988 Eurovision Song Contest. In 2000, Ki Fitzgerald was an original member of pop punk band Busted.

Career
Fitzgerald later formed the band Eyes Wide Open and signed a publishing deal with Music Copyright Solutions. The band toured the UK after making their debut at the GWR Fiesta to an audience of 40,000 people. The band members consisted of: Ki (vocals and guitar), Tom Warner (lead guitar), TK (bass guitar) and Pat Garvery (drums) and Will Farquarson (Guitar) who went on to become a member of Band Bastille. The band made many appearances at festivals performing tracks "Bitter Sweet" and "By Your Side" receiving praise from BBC Radio Kent who said that Eyes Wide Open's "songs and production are really strong" and were considered to be "far more the real Ki...than his original Busted material". The band broke up whilst in the process of recording their debut album with producer Steve Lironi (Bon Jovi) and Grammy award-winning mixer Simon Gogerly.

In 2015 he signed an artist deal with producer RedOne and his label 2101/capital records to develop his own album and to Join RedOne's writing group Team Red. The first release with Dutch DJ duo Sunnery James & Ryan Marciano was the song Come Follow with vocals from KiFi. It was released through Spinnin' Records in February 2015. Fitzgerald has been featured Vocalist on many EDM songs, including the single "Shine a Light" by Hardwell and Wildstylez, "Steal the moon" by DubVision, "Best part of me" by Firebeatz and DubVision, the Headhunterz single "Into the Sunset" which was featured on Ellen DeGeneres, Dancing with the Stars and upcoming releases with Armin van Buuren, Dash Berlin and many more. KiFi has streamed well over 100 million streams just on Spotify with his feature vocals.

Songwriting and music production
In October 2011, Fitzgerald signed with Global Talent Publishing to focus on songwriting for other artists. Since then Fitzgerald has fast become a successful songwriter and producer for a diverse group of artists such as Galantis, Lawson, The Wanted, Jonas Brothers, B.o.B, Alex Hepburn, and Pitbull.

He is credited with having written 4 top 10 singles with UK band Lawson, including the releases "When She Was Mine" (UK No.4)  "Standing in the Dark" (UK No.6) "Broken Hearted" featuring USA rapper B.o.B  (Uk No.6) and final single Roads. Fitzgerald also contributed to the album tracks "Stolen" and "Everywhere You Go", "Die for You", "Getting Nowhere", "Hurts Like You", "Are You Ready", and "Back to Life", which featured on Lawson's top 10 debut album Chapman Square and "Chapman Square – Special Edition (Chapter II).

Fitzgerald worked on the third and final album from The Wanted, Word of Mouth, which featured two co-writes, "Summer Alive" and "Heart Break Story".

He co-wrote the debut single by Sophia Del Carmen featuring Pitbull "Lipstick" with RedOne.

On Lawson's follow-up album Perspective'', Fitzgerald co-wrote 11 songs including the singles "Money" and "Under the Sun". The album was released in June 2016.

He co-wrote and co-produced the single "Hunter" for Galantis and Madcon's "Got a Little Drunk".

More recently he co-wrote the Galantis single "San Francisco" featuring Sofia Carson. Fitzgerald wrote the single from Dimitri Vegas & Like Mike featuring Wiz Khalifa, "When I Grow Up". He also collaborated on the single from Sweater Beats and Icona Pop, "Faded".

He co-wrote "Monsters" for Saara Aalto for the Eurovision Song Contest 2018, where she represented Finland. Fitzgerald attended the Eurovision contest in Lisbon with Ms Aalto.

He co-wrote and gave the vocals on Armin van Buuren's single "Turn It Up" released in March 2019.

External Links 
 List of song credits at AllMusic

References

1983 births
Living people
Singers from London
English people of Scottish descent
English pop rock singers
English male singer-songwriters
English record producers
Musicians from Rotterdam
People from Kent
21st-century English singers
21st-century British male singers